Atim Joy Ongom, (born 15 September 1968) is a Ugandan businesswoman and politician, who served as the  Member of Parliament representing the Lira District Women Constituency in the 10th Parliament (2016 to 2021).

Background and education
She was born Joy Atim, on 15 September 1968, in Lira District, in the Northern Region of Uganda. She attended local schools for her pre-university education. In 1989 she was admitted to Uganda College of Commerce Aduku, in Aduku, Apac District, graduating two years later with a Diploma in Business Studies (DipBS). Later in 2011, she graduated from Kampala International University with a Bachelor of Public Administration (BPA).

Work experience
In 1993 she was hired by the firm called "Riclen Printers", working there as a cashier for six years, until 1999. She then moved to another business called "Jocent Enterprises", where she served as the managing director, until 2011. Then from 2005, she is the managing director at another business called "Hillside Annex", a position she still maintains while a member of parliament.

Political career
During the 2006 – 2011 election cycle, Joy Atim was elected to the Lira District Local Government, serving there as a District Councillor. In 2011, she contested to represent the women in Lira District in the 9th Parliament (2011 to 2016). During that cycle, she ran as an Independent candidate and won.

During the 2016 elections, she ran under the opposition Uganda People's Congress (UPC) political party's banner, was re-elected and is the incumbent. She is one of the members of the Uganda parliament who are opposed to the amendment of the constitution, to remove presidential age limits. Her political rallies have been targeted by the Uganda Police Force, resulting in injuries and hospitalizations. However, in  the 2021 general polls, she lost to Minister Dr. Jane Ruth Aceng.

Family
Ms. Joy Atim Ongom is married to Mr. Ongom Innocent.

Other considerations
In the 10th Parliament, Joy Atim was a member of two parliamentary committees: (a) the Appointments Committee and (b) the Budget Committee.

See also
 Angelline Osegge
 Winnie Kiiza
 Cecilia Ogwal
 List of members of the tenth Parliament of Uganda
 List of members of the ninth Parliament of Uganda
 Lira District

References

External links
Website of the Parliament of Uganda
New MPs take center stage As of 28 November 2016.

Living people
1969 births
Members of the Parliament of Uganda
Uganda People's Congress politicians
People from Lira District
People from Northern Region, Uganda
21st-century Ugandan women politicians
21st-century Ugandan politicians
Kampala International University alumni
Women members of the Parliament of Uganda